Melissa is the third album by Melissa Manchester, released on the Arista Records label in 1975. It reached #12 on the Billboard Albums chart on the strength of her first U.S. Top Ten hit "Midnight Blue" (#6).  In 2001 the album was re-released.

Track listing 

 "We've Got Time" (Manchester, Carole Bayer Sager) – 4:24
 "Party Music" (Manchester, David Wolfert) – 3:29
 "Just Too Many People" (Manchester, Vini Poncia) – 3:38
 "Stevie's Wonder" (Manchester, Carole Bayer Sager) – 3:35
 "This Lady's Not Home Today" (Manchester, Carole Bayer Sager) – 4:33
 "Love Havin' You Around" (Stevie Wonder, Syreeta Wright) – 4:40
 "Midnight Blue" (Manchester, Carole Bayer Sager) – 3:55
 "It's Gonna Be Alright" (Manchester, Adrienne Anderson) – 3:34
 "I Got Eyes" (Manchester) – 2:45
 "I Don't Want to Hear It Anymore" (Randy Newman) – 5:05

Personnel 
 Melissa Manchester – lead vocals, acoustic piano (1, 4, 7, 8, 10), electric piano (5, 9), clavinet (6)
 James Newton Howard – electric piano (1-4, 7), clavinet (2, 8), ARP synthesizer (2, 9), organ (5, 6), acoustic piano (6), celesta (9)
 David Wolfert – acoustic guitar (1, 7), electric guitar (1-7), guitar (8)
 Cooker Lo Presti – bass (1-9)
 Kirk Bruner – drums (1-8), percussion (2, 4), cuica (4), talking drum (6), backing vocals (9)
 King Errisson – congas (2, 5, 8)
 Don Diego Gujo – cowbell (8)
 Morton K. Salt – percussion (9)
 Trevor Lawrence– tenor saxophone (3, 6, 8), horn arrangements (3, 6, 8), string arrangements (3, 5, 7, 10), soprano saxophone (5), baritone saxophone (6, 8), alto saxophone (10)
 John Rotella – baritone saxophone (3)
 Gene Dinwiddie – tenor saxophone (6, 8)
 Lew McCreary – trombone (3)
 Steve Madaio – trumpet (3, 6, 8)
 Vini Poncia – backing vocals (1, 2, 7, 9)
 The Rhinestones – backing vocals (2)
 David Lasley – backing vocals (6)
 Arnold McCuller – backing vocals (6)
 Brie Howard – backing vocals (9)

Production 
 Producer – Vini Poncia
 Executive Producer – Richard Perry
 Engineer – Bob Schaper
 Assistant Engineer – Reed Stanley
 Recorded at Sunset Sound (Los Angeles, CA) and A&R Studios (New York, NY).
 Remixed by Bill Schnee at Sound Labs (Hollywood, CA).
 Art Direction – Bob Heimall
 Design – Arton Associates
 Illustration – Pacific Eye & Ear
 Photography – Ed Caraeff

References 

1975 albums
Albums produced by Vini Poncia
Arista Records albums
Melissa Manchester albums